Leela attitude is an attitude of Buddha in Thai art of which the Buddha is stepping with his right foot and his right hand swinging and the other hand put towards to the front. The attitude is sometimes called the Walking Buddha.

The attitude refers to the episode where he is walking back to the earth from Dao Wadeung heaven (Trayastrimsa/Tavatimsa) with Devas and Brahmas that follow.

Gallery

See also
 Iconography of Gautama Buddha in Laos and Thailand
 Maravijaya attitude
 Meditation attitude
 Mudra
 Reclining Buddha

References 
Thai Buddha Attitudes translations
translated from :th:ปางลีลา on Thai Wikipedia

External links

Buddhist art
Buddhist iconography
Laotian art
Buddha statues in Thailand
Buddhism in Laos